The Square Tower is a clock tower in Kuching, Sarawak, Malaysia.

History
The building was originally constructed in 1879 as a prison. It was then later turned into a fortress.

Architecture
The building bears the Brooke era coat of arms.

See also
 List of tourist attractions in Malaysia

References

1879 establishments in Sarawak
Buildings and structures completed in 1879
Buildings and structures in Kuching
19th-century architecture in Malaysia